In celestial mechanics, orbital resonance occurs when orbiting bodies exert regular, periodic gravitational influence on each other, usually because their orbital periods are related by a ratio of small integers. Most commonly, this relationship is found between a pair of objects (binary resonance). The physical principle behind orbital resonance is similar in concept to pushing a child on a swing, whereby the orbit and the swing both have a natural frequency, and the body doing the "pushing" will act in periodic repetition to have a cumulative effect on the motion. Orbital resonances greatly enhance the mutual gravitational influence of the bodies (i.e., their ability to alter or constrain each other's orbits). In most cases, this results in an unstable interaction, in which the bodies exchange momentum and shift orbits until the resonance no longer exists. Under some circumstances, a resonant system can be self-correcting and thus stable. Examples are the 1:2:4 resonance of Jupiter's moons Ganymede, Europa and Io, and the 2:3 resonance between Pluto and Neptune. Unstable resonances with Saturn's inner moons give rise to gaps in the rings of Saturn. The special case of 1:1 resonance between bodies with similar orbital radii causes large solar system bodies to eject most other bodies sharing their orbits; this is part of the much more extensive process of clearing the neighbourhood, an effect that is used in the current definition of a planet.

A binary resonance ratio in this article should be interpreted as the ratio of number of orbits completed in the same time interval, rather than as the ratio of orbital periods, which would be the inverse ratio. Thus, the 2:3 ratio above means that Pluto completes two orbits in the time it takes Neptune to complete three. In the case of resonance relationships among three or more bodies, either type of ratio may be used (whereby the smallest whole-integer ratio sequences are not necessarily reversals of each other), and the type of ratio will be specified.

History 
Since the discovery of Newton's law of universal gravitation in the 17th century, the stability of the Solar System has preoccupied many mathematicians, starting with Pierre-Simon Laplace. The stable orbits that arise in a two-body approximation ignore the influence of other bodies. The effect of these added interactions on the stability of the Solar System is very small, but at first it was not known whether they might add up over longer periods to significantly change the orbital parameters and lead to a completely different configuration, or whether some other stabilising effects might maintain the configuration of the orbits of the planets.

It was Laplace who found the first answers explaining the linked orbits of the Galilean moons (see below). Before Newton, there was also consideration of ratios and proportions in orbital motions, in what was called "the music of the spheres", or musica universalis.

The article on resonant interactions describes resonance in the general modern setting. A primary result from the study of dynamical systems is the discovery and description of a highly simplified model of mode-locking; this is an oscillator that receives periodic kicks via a weak coupling to some driving motor. The analog here would be that a more massive body provides a periodic gravitational kick to a smaller body, as it passes by. The mode-locking regions are named Arnold tongues.

Types of resonance

In general, an orbital resonance may
involve one or any combination of the orbit parameters (e.g. eccentricity versus semimajor axis, or eccentricity versus inclination).
act on any time scale from short term, commensurable with the orbit periods, to secular, measured in 104 to 106 years.
lead to either long-term stabilization of the orbits or be the cause of their destabilization.

A mean-motion orbital resonance occurs when two bodies have periods of revolution that are a simple integer ratio of each other. Depending on the details, this can either stabilize or destabilize the orbit.
Stabilization may occur when the two bodies move in such a synchronised fashion that they never closely approach. For instance:
The orbits of Pluto and the plutinos are stable, despite crossing that of the much larger Neptune, because they are in a 2:3 resonance with it. The resonance ensures that, when they approach perihelion and Neptune's orbit, Neptune is consistently distant (averaging a quarter of its orbit away). Other (much more numerous) Neptune-crossing bodies that were not in resonance were ejected from that region by strong perturbations due to Neptune. There are also smaller but significant groups of resonant trans-Neptunian objects occupying the 1:1 (Neptune trojans), 3:5, 4:7, 1:2 (twotinos) and 2:5 resonances, among others, with respect to Neptune.
In the asteroid belt beyond 3.5 AU from the Sun, the 3:2, 4:3 and 1:1 resonances with Jupiter are populated by clumps of asteroids (the Hilda family, the few Thule asteroids, and the numerous Trojan asteroids, respectively).

Orbital resonances can also destabilize one of the orbits. This process can be exploited to find energy-efficient ways of deorbiting spacecraft. For small bodies, destabilization is actually far more likely. For instance:
In the asteroid belt within 3.5 AU from the Sun, the major mean-motion resonances with Jupiter are locations of gaps in the asteroid distribution, the Kirkwood gaps (most notably at the 4:1, 3:1, 5:2, 7:3 and 2:1 resonances). Asteroids have been ejected from these almost empty lanes by repeated perturbations. However, there are still populations of asteroids temporarily present in or near these resonances. For example, asteroids of the Alinda family are in or close to the 3:1 resonance, with their orbital eccentricity steadily increased by interactions with Jupiter until they eventually have a close encounter with an inner planet that ejects them from the resonance.
In the rings of Saturn, the Cassini Division is a gap between the inner B Ring and the outer A Ring that has been cleared by a 2:1 resonance with the moon Mimas. (More specifically, the site of the resonance is the Huygens Gap, which bounds the outer edge of the B Ring.)
In the rings of Saturn, the Encke and Keeler gaps within the A Ring are cleared by 1:1 resonances with the embedded moonlets Pan and Daphnis, respectively. The A Ring's outer edge is maintained by a destabilizing 7:6 resonance with the moon Janus.

Most bodies that are in resonance orbit in the same direction; however, the retrograde asteroid 514107 Kaʻepaokaʻawela appears to be in a stable (for a period of at least a million years) 1:−1 resonance with Jupiter. In addition, a few retrograde damocloids have been found that are temporarily captured in mean-motion resonance with Jupiter or Saturn. Such orbital interactions are weaker than the corresponding interactions between bodies orbiting in the same direction.

A Laplace resonance is a three-body resonance with a 1:2:4 orbital period ratio (equivalent to a 4:2:1 ratio of orbits). The term arose because Pierre-Simon Laplace discovered that such a resonance governed the motions of Jupiter's moons Io, Europa, and Ganymede. It is now also often applied to other 3-body resonances with the same ratios, such as that between the extrasolar planets Gliese 876 c, b, and e. Three-body resonances involving other simple integer ratios have been termed "Laplace-like" or "Laplace-type".

A Lindblad resonance drives spiral density waves both in galaxies (where stars are subject to forcing by the spiral arms themselves) and in Saturn's rings (where ring particles are subject to forcing by Saturn's moons).

A secular resonance occurs when the precession of two orbits is synchronised (usually a precession of the perihelion or ascending node). A small body in secular resonance with a much larger one (e.g. a planet) will precess at the same rate as the large body. Over long times (a million years, or so) a secular resonance will change the eccentricity and inclination of the small body.

Several prominent examples of secular resonance involve Saturn. There is a near-resonance between the precession of Saturn's rotational axis and that of Neptune's orbital axis (both of which have periods of about 1.87 million years), which has been identified as the likely source of Saturn's large axial tilt (26.7°). Initially, Saturn probably had a tilt closer to that of Jupiter (3.1°). The gradual depletion of the Kuiper belt would have decreased the precession rate of Neptune's orbit; eventually, the frequencies matched, and Saturn's axial precession was captured into a spin-orbit resonance, leading to an increase in Saturn's obliquity. (The angular momentum of Neptune's orbit is 104 times that of Saturn's rotation rate, and thus dominates the interaction.) However, it seems that the resonance no longer exists. Detailed analysis of data from the Cassini spacecraft gives a value of the moment of inertia of Saturn that is just outside the range for the resonance to exist, meaning that the spin axis does not stay in phase with Neptune's orbital inclination in the long term, as it apparently did in the past. One theory for why the resonance came to an end is that there was another moon around Saturn whose orbit destabilized about 100 million years ago, perturbing Saturn.

The perihelion secular resonance between asteroids and Saturn (ν6 = g − g6) helps shape the asteroid belt (the subscript "6" identifies Saturn as the sixth planet from the Sun). Asteroids which approach it have their eccentricity slowly increased until they become Mars-crossers, at which point they are usually ejected from the asteroid belt by a close pass to Mars. This resonance forms the inner and "side" boundaries of the asteroid belt around 2 AU, and at inclinations of about 20°.

Numerical simulations have suggested that the eventual formation of a perihelion secular resonance between Mercury and Jupiter (g1 = g5) has the potential to greatly increase Mercury's eccentricity and possibly destabilize the inner Solar System several billion years from now.

The Titan Ringlet within Saturn's C Ring represents another type of resonance in which the rate of apsidal precession of one orbit exactly matches the speed of revolution of another. The outer end of this eccentric ringlet always points towards Saturn's major moon Titan.

A Kozai resonance occurs when the inclination and eccentricity of a perturbed orbit oscillate synchronously (increasing eccentricity while decreasing inclination and vice versa). This resonance applies only to bodies on highly inclined orbits; as a consequence, such orbits tend to be unstable, since the growing eccentricity would result in small pericenters, typically leading to a collision or (for large moons) destruction by tidal forces.

In an example of another type of resonance involving orbital eccentricity, the eccentricities of Ganymede and Callisto vary with a common period of 181 years, although with opposite phases.

Mean-motion resonances in the Solar System 

There are only a few known mean-motion resonances (MMR) in the Solar System involving planets, dwarf planets or larger satellites (a much greater number involve asteroids, planetary rings, moonlets and smaller Kuiper belt objects, including many possible dwarf planets).
 2:3 Pluto–Neptune (also  and other plutinos)
 2:4 Tethys–Mimas (Saturn's moons). Not simplified, because the libration of the nodes must be taken into account.
 1:2 Dione–Enceladus (Saturn's moons)
 3:4 Hyperion–Titan (Saturn's moons)
 1:2:4 Ganymede–Europa–Io (Jupiter's moons, ratio of orbits).

The simple integer ratios between periods hide more complex relations:
the point of conjunction can oscillate (librate) around an equilibrium point defined by the resonance.
given non-zero eccentricities, the nodes or periapsides can drift (a resonance related, short period, not secular precession).

As illustration of the latter, consider the well-known 2:1 resonance of Io-Europa. If the orbiting periods were in this relation, the mean motions  (inverse of periods, often expressed in degrees per day) would satisfy the following

 

Substituting the data (from Wikipedia) one will get −0.7395° day−1, a value substantially different from zero.

Actually, the resonance  perfect, but it involves also the precession of perijove (the point closest to Jupiter), . The correct equation (part of the Laplace equations) is:

 

In other words, the mean motion of Io is indeed double of that of Europa taking into account the precession of the perijove. An observer sitting on the (drifting) perijove will see the moons coming into conjunction in the same place (elongation). The other pairs listed above satisfy the same type of equation with the exception of Mimas-Tethys resonance. In this case, the resonance satisfies the equation

 

The point of conjunctions librates around the midpoint between the nodes of the two moons.

Laplace resonance 

The Laplace resonance involving Io–Europa–Ganymede includes the following relation locking the orbital phase of the moons:

where  are mean longitudes of the moons (the second equals sign ignores libration).

This relation makes a triple conjunction impossible. (A Laplace resonance in the Gliese 876 system, in contrast, is associated with one triple conjunction per orbit of the outermost planet, ignoring libration.) The graph illustrates the positions of the moons after 1, 2 and 3 Io periods.  librates about 180° with an amplitude of 0.03°.

Another "Laplace-like" resonance involves the moons Styx, Nix and Hydra of Pluto:

This reflects orbital periods for Styx, Nix and Hydra, respectively, that are close to a ratio of 18:22:33 (or, in terms of the near resonances with Charon's period, 3+3/11:4:6; see below); the respective ratio of orbits is 11:9:6. Based on the ratios of synodic periods, there are 5 conjunctions of Styx and Hydra and 3 conjunctions of Nix and Hydra for every 2 conjunctions of Styx and Nix. As with the Galilean satellite resonance, triple conjunctions are forbidden.  librates about 180° with an amplitude of at least 10°.

Plutino resonances 
The dwarf planet Pluto is following an orbit trapped in a web of resonances with Neptune. The resonances include:
A mean-motion resonance of 2:3
The resonance of the perihelion (libration around 90°), keeping the perihelion above the ecliptic
The resonance of the longitude of the perihelion in relation to that of Neptune
One consequence of these resonances is that a separation of at least 30 AU is maintained when Pluto crosses Neptune's orbit. The minimum separation between the two bodies overall is 17 AU, while the minimum separation between Pluto and Uranus is just 11 AU (see Pluto's orbit for detailed explanation and graphs).

The next largest body in a similar 2:3 resonance with Neptune, called a plutino, is the probable dwarf planet Orcus. Orcus has an orbit similar in inclination and eccentricity to Pluto's. However, the two are constrained by their mutual resonance with Neptune to always be in opposite phases of their orbits; Orcus is thus sometimes described as the "anti-Pluto".

Naiad:Thalassa 73:69 resonance 
Neptune's innermost moon, Naiad, is in a 73:69 fourth-order resonance with the next outward moon, Thalassa. As it orbits Neptune, the more inclined Naiad successively passes Thalassa twice from above and then twice from below, in a cycle that repeats every ~21.5 Earth days. The two moons are about 3540 km apart when they pass each other. Although their orbital radii differ by only 1850 km, Naiad swings ~2800 km above or below Thalassa's orbital plane at closest approach. As is common, this resonance stabilizes the orbits by maximizing separation at conjunction, but it is unusual for the role played by orbital inclination in facilitating this avoidance in a case where eccentricities are minimal.

Mean-motion resonances among extrasolar planets 

While most extrasolar planetary systems discovered have not been found to have planets in mean-motion resonances, chains of up to five resonant planets and up to seven at least near resonant planets have been uncovered. Simulations have shown that during planetary system formation, the appearance of resonant chains of planetary embryos is favored by the presence of the primordial gas disc. Once that gas dissipates, 90–95% of those chains must then become unstable to match the low frequency of resonant chains observed.
As mentioned above, Gliese 876 e, b and c are in a Laplace resonance, with a 4:2:1 ratio of periods (124.3, 61.1 and 30.0 days). In this case,  librates with an amplitude of 40° ± 13° and the resonance follows the time-averaged relation:

Kepler-223 has four planets in a resonance with an 8:6:4:3 orbit ratio, and a 3:4:6:8 ratio of periods (7.3845, 9.8456, 14.7887 and 19.7257 days). This represents the first confirmed 4-body orbital resonance. The librations within this system are such that close encounters between two planets occur only when the other planets are in distant parts of their orbits. Simulations indicate that this system of resonances must have formed via planetary migration.
Kepler-80 d, e, b, c and g have periods in a ~ 1.000: 1.512: 2.296: 3.100: 4.767 ratio (3.0722, 4.6449, 7.0525, 9.5236 and 14.6456 days). However, in a frame of reference that rotates with the conjunctions, this reduces to a period ratio of 4:6:9:12:18 (an orbit ratio of 9:6:4:3:2). Conjunctions of d and e, e and b, b and c, and c and g occur at relative intervals of 2:3:6:6 (9.07, 13.61 and 27.21 days) in a pattern that repeats about every 190.5 days (seven full cycles in the rotating frame) in the inertial or nonrotating frame (equivalent to a 62:41:27:20:13 orbit ratio resonance in the nonrotating frame, because the conjunctions circulate in the direction opposite orbital motion). Librations of possible three-body resonances have amplitudes of only about 3 degrees, and modeling indicates the resonant system is stable to perturbations. Triple conjunctions do not occur.
TOI-178 has 6 confirmed planets, of which the outer 5 planets form a similar resonant chain in a rotating frame of reference, which can be expressed as 2:4:6:9:12 in period ratios, or as 18:9:6:4:3 in orbit ratios. In addition, the innermost planet b with period of 1.91d orbits close to where it would also be part of the same Laplace resonance chain, as a 3:5 resonance with the planet c would be fulfilled at period of ~1.95d, implying that it might have evolved there but pulled out of resonance, possibly by tidal forces.
 TRAPPIST-1's seven approximately Earth-sized planets are in a chain of near resonances (the longest such chain known), having an orbit ratio of approximately 24, 15, 9, 6, 4, 3 and 2, or nearest-neighbor period ratios (proceeding outward) of about 8/5, 5/3, 3/2, 3/2, 4/3 and 3/2 (1.603, 1.672, 1.506, 1.509, 1.342 and 1.519). They are also configured such that each triple of adjacent planets is in a Laplace resonance (i.e., b, c and d in one such Laplace configuration; c, d and e in another, etc.). The resonant configuration is expected to be stable on a time scale of billions of years, assuming it arose during planetary migration. A musical interpretation of the resonance has been provided.
Kepler-29 has a pair of planets in a 7:9 resonance (ratio of 1/1.28587).
Kepler-36 has a pair of planets close to a 6:7 resonance.
Kepler-37 d, c and b are within one percent of a resonance with an 8:15:24 orbit ratio and a 15:8:5 ratio of periods (39.792187, 21.301886 and 13.367308 days).
Of Kepler-90's eight known planets, the period ratios b:c, c:i and i:d are close to 4:5, 3:5 and 1:4, respectively (4:4.977, 3:4.97 and 1:4.13) and d, e, f, g and h are close to a 2:3:4:7:11 period ratio (2: 3.078: 4.182: 7.051: 11.102; also 7: 11.021). f, g and h are also close to a 3:5:8 period ratio (3: 5.058: 7.964). Relevant to systems like this and that of Kepler-36, calculations suggest that the presence of an outer gas giant planet facilitates the formation of closely packed resonances among inner super-Earths.
HD 41248 has a pair of super-Earths within 0.3% of a 5:7 resonance (ratio of 1/1.39718).
K2-138 has 5 confirmed planets in an unbroken near-3:2 resonance chain (with periods of 2.353, 3.560, 5.405, 8.261 and 12.758 days). The system was discovered in the citizen science project Exoplanet Explorers, using K2 data. K2-138 could host co-orbital bodies (in a 1:1 mean-motion resonance). Resonant chain systems can stabilize co-orbital bodies and a dedicated analysis of the K2 light curve and radial-velocity from HARPS might reveal them. Follow-up observations with the Spitzer Space Telescope suggest a sixth planet continuing the 3:2 resonance chain, while leaving two gaps in the chain (its period is 41.97 days). These gaps could be filled by smaller non-transiting planets. Future observations with CHEOPS will measure transit-timing variations of the system to further analyse the mass of the planets and could potentially find other planetary bodies in the system.
K2-32 has four planets in a near 1:2:5:7 resonance (with periods of 4.34, 8.99, 20.66 and 31.71 days). Planet e has a radius almost identical to that of the Earth. The other planets have a size between Neptune and Saturn.
V1298 Tauri has four confirmed planets of which planets c, d and b are near a 1:2:3 resonance (with periods of 8.25, 12.40 and 24.14 days). Planet e only shows a single transit in the K2 light curve and has a period larger than 36 days. Planet e might be in a low-order resonance (of 2:3, 3:5, 1:2, or 1:3) with planet b. The system is very young (23±4 Myr) and might be a precursor of a compact multiplanet system. The 2:3 resonance suggests that some close-in planets may either form in resonances or evolve into them on timescales of less than 10 Myr. The planets in the system have a size between Neptune and Saturn. Only planet b has a size similar to Jupiter.
HD 158259 contains four planets in a 3:2 near resonance chain (with periods of 3.432, 5.198, 7.954 and 12.03 days, or period ratios of 1.51, 1.53 and 1.51, respectively), with a possible fifth planet also near a 3:2 resonance (with a period of 17.4 days). The exoplanets were found with the SOPHIE échelle spectrograph, using the radial velocity method.
Kepler-1649 contains two Earth-size planets close to a 9:4 resonance (with periods of 19.53527 and 8.689099 days, or a period ratio of 2.24825), including one ("c") in the habitable zone. An undetected planet with a 13.0-day period would create a 3:2 resonance chain.
Kepler-88 has a pair of inner planets close to a 1:2 resonance (period ratio of 2.0396), with a mass ratio of ~22.5, producing very large transit timing variations of ~0.5 days for the innermost planet. There is a yet more massive outer planet in a ~1400 day orbit.

Cases of extrasolar planets close to a 1:2 mean-motion resonance are fairly common. Sixteen percent of systems found by the transit method are reported to have an example of this (with period ratios in the range 1.83–2.18), as well as one sixth of planetary systems characterized by Doppler spectroscopy (with in this case a narrower period ratio range). Due to incomplete knowledge of the systems, the actual proportions are likely to be higher. Overall, about a third of radial velocity characterized systems appear to have a pair of planets close to a commensurability. It is much more common for pairs of planets to have orbital period ratios a few percent larger than a mean-motion resonance ratio than a few percent smaller (particularly in the case of first order resonances, in which the integers in the ratio differ by one). This was predicted to be true in cases where tidal interactions with the star are significant.

Coincidental 'near' ratios of mean motion 

A number of near-integer-ratio relationships between the orbital frequencies of the planets or major moons are sometimes pointed out (see list below). However, these have no dynamical significance because there is no appropriate precession of perihelion or other libration to make the resonance perfect (see the detailed discussion in the section above). Such near resonances are dynamically insignificant even if the mismatch is quite small because (unlike a true resonance), after each cycle the relative position of the bodies shifts. When averaged over astronomically short timescales, their relative position is random, just like bodies that are nowhere near resonance. For example, consider the orbits of Earth and Venus, which arrive at almost the same configuration after 8 Earth orbits and 13 Venus orbits. The actual ratio is 0.61518624, which is only 0.032% away from exactly 8:13. The mismatch after 8 years is only 1.5° of Venus' orbital movement. Still, this is enough that Venus and Earth find themselves in the opposite relative orientation to the original every 120 such cycles, which is 960 years. Therefore, on timescales of thousands of years or more (still tiny by astronomical standards), their relative position is effectively random.

The presence of a near resonance may reflect that a perfect resonance existed in the past, or that the system is evolving towards one in the future.

Some orbital frequency coincidences include:

The least probable orbital correlation in the list is that between Io and Metis, followed by those between Rosalind and Cordelia, Pallas and Ceres, Jupiter and Pallas, Callisto and Ganymede, and Hydra and Charon, respectively.

Possible past mean-motion resonances 
A past resonance between Jupiter and Saturn may have played a dramatic role in early Solar System history. A 2004 computer model by Alessandro Morbidelli of the Observatoire de la Côte d'Azur in Nice suggested the formation of a 1:2 resonance between Jupiter and Saturn due to interactions with planetesimals that caused them to migrate inward and outward, respectively. In the model, this created a gravitational push that propelled both Uranus and Neptune into higher orbits, and in some scenarios caused them to switch places, which would have doubled Neptune's distance from the Sun. The resultant expulsion of objects from the proto-Kuiper belt as Neptune moved outwards could explain the Late Heavy Bombardment 600 million years after the Solar System's formation and the origin of Jupiter's Trojan asteroids. An outward migration of Neptune could also explain the current occupancy of some of its resonances (particularly the 2:5 resonance) within the Kuiper belt.

While Saturn's mid-sized moons Dione and Tethys are not close to an exact resonance now, they may have been in a 2:3 resonance early in the Solar System's history. This would have led to orbital eccentricity and tidal heating that may have warmed Tethys' interior enough to form a subsurface ocean. Subsequent freezing of the ocean after the moons escaped from the resonance may have generated the extensional stresses that created the enormous graben system of Ithaca Chasma on Tethys.

The satellite system of Uranus is notably different from those of Jupiter and Saturn in that it lacks precise resonances among the larger moons, while the majority of the larger moons of Jupiter (3 of the 4 largest) and of Saturn (6 of the 8 largest) are in mean-motion resonances. In all three satellite systems, moons were likely captured into mean-motion resonances in the past as their orbits shifted due to tidal dissipation, a process by which satellites gain orbital energy at the expense of the primary's rotational energy, affecting inner moons disproportionately. In the Uranian system, however, due to the planet's lesser degree of oblateness, and the larger relative size of its satellites, escape from a mean-motion resonance is much easier. Lower oblateness of the primary alters its gravitational field in such a way that different possible resonances are spaced more closely together. A larger relative satellite size increases the strength of their interactions. Both factors lead to more chaotic orbital behavior at or near mean-motion resonances. Escape from a resonance may be associated with capture into a secondary resonance, and/or tidal evolution-driven increases in orbital eccentricity or inclination.

Mean-motion resonances that probably once existed in the Uranus System include (3:5) Ariel-Miranda, (1:3) Umbriel-Miranda, (3:5) Umbriel-Ariel, and (1:4) Titania-Ariel. Evidence for such past resonances includes the relatively high eccentricities of the orbits of Uranus' inner satellites, and the anomalously high orbital inclination of Miranda. High past orbital eccentricities associated with the (1:3) Umbriel-Miranda and (1:4) Titania-Ariel resonances may have led to tidal heating of the interiors of Miranda and Ariel, respectively. Miranda probably escaped from its resonance with Umbriel via a secondary resonance, and the mechanism of this escape is believed to explain why its orbital inclination is more than 10 times those of the other regular Uranian moons (see Uranus' natural satellites).

Similar to the case of Miranda, the present inclinations of Jupiter's moonlets Amalthea and Thebe are thought to be indications of past passage through the 3:1 and 4:2 resonances with Io, respectively.

Neptune's regular moons Proteus and Larissa are thought to have passed through a 1:2 resonance a few hundred million years ago; the moons have drifted away from each other since then because Proteus is outside a synchronous orbit and Larissa is within one. Passage through the resonance is thought to have excited both moons' eccentricities to a degree that has not since been entirely damped out.

In the case of Pluto's satellites, it has been proposed that the present near resonances are relics of a previous precise resonance that was disrupted by tidal damping of the eccentricity of Charon's orbit (see Pluto's natural satellites for details). The near resonances may be maintained by a 15% local fluctuation in the Pluto-Charon gravitational field. Thus, these near resonances may not be coincidental.

The smaller inner moon of the dwarf planet Haumea, Namaka, is one tenth the mass of the larger outer moon, Hiʻiaka. Namaka revolves around Haumea in 18 days in an eccentric, non-Keplerian orbit, and as of 2008 is inclined 13° from Hiʻiaka. Over the timescale of the system, it should have been tidally damped into a more circular orbit. It appears that it has been disturbed by resonances with the more massive Hiʻiaka, due to converging orbits as it moved outward from Haumea because of tidal dissipation. The moons may have been caught in and then escaped from orbital resonance several times. They probably passed through the 3:1 resonance relatively recently, and currently are in or at least close to an 8:3 resonance. Namaka's orbit is strongly perturbed, with a current precession of about −6.5° per year.

See also 

1685 Toro, an asteroid in 5:8 resonance with the Earth
3753 Cruithne, an asteroid in 1:1 resonance with the Earth
Arnold tongue
Commensurability (astronomy)
Dermott's law
Horseshoe orbit, followed by an object in another type of 1:1 resonance
Kozai resonance
Lagrange points
Mercury, which has a 3:2 spin-orbit resonance
Musica universalis ("music of the spheres")
Resonant interaction
Resonant trans-Neptunian object
Tidal locking
Tidal resonance
Titius–Bode law
Transfer operator
Trojan (celestial body), a body in a type of 1:1 resonance
Venus, whose Earth conjunction period (584 Earth days) is close to 5 times its solar day (116.75 days)

Notes

References

External links